Lieutenant-General Ralph J. Jodice II (born 1955) is a retired United States Air Force general and a former Commander of NATO's Allied Air Command at Izmir, Turkey.  He was also the Air Component Commander for Operation Unified Protector, NATO's operation to enforce United Nations Security Council resolutions 1970 and 1973 during the 2011 Libyan civil war.

Awards

Notes

External links

United States Air Force generals
People of the First Libyan Civil War
1955 births
Living people
United States air attachés
NATO military personnel